The Catholic Church in Morocco is part of the worldwide Catholic Church (particularly the Latin Church), under the spiritual leadership of the Pope in Rome. Catholics account for only about .07% of the overall population of over 31 million. The country is divided into two archdioceses; Rabat and Tangier.

Demographics
There are around 50,000 Catholics in Morocco; most of them are European expatriates, with a big majority of French and Spanish from colonization and post-independence.  The second group is composed of Sub-Saharan immigrants, mainly students. Aside from Arabic, all of the Europeans can speak Spanish and French, which are also spoken by Catholic Arabs, Berbers, and Moors, and these languages are used in the celebration of Mass, in prayer meetings, and in education. 

There are also converts from Islam, the dominant religion and when they exist, they keep their faith secret. On March 31, 2019, Pope Francis openly acknowledged that there are few Catholics, as well as few Catholic church workers, in the country.

List of cathedrals and churches 

Casablanca
Church of Our Lady of Lourdes 
Church of Anfa-Maarif
Church of Carmel Saint Joseph
Church of Christ the King
Church of Saint Francis of Assisi
Sacré-Cœur Cathedral 
Church of Saint James

Rabat
St. Peter's Cathedral
Church of Saint Pius X
Church of Saint Francis of Assisi
Our Lady of Peace

Tangier
 Church of the Immaculate Conception
 French Church of Tangier
 Roman Catholic Cathedral of Tangier

Agadir
Church of Saint Anne

Marrakech
Church of the Holy Martyrs

Meknes
Notre Dame des Oliviers

Fes
Church of Saint Francis of Assisi

El Jadida
Church of Saint Bernard

 Tetouan 
Church of Nuestra Señora de las Victorias

Archdiocese of Rabat 
The Archdiocese of Rabat is divided into 4 regions:

Region of Rabat
Region of Casablanca
Region East
Region South

Archdiocese of Tangier

Chronology of Catholic Dioceses
40-100 Toledo - Spain (Tamazgha, Morocco) 
300-400 Toledo (Metr.) - Spain  (Tamazgha, Morocco)
1226 Fez (established from Toledo) 
1234 Marrakech (in part continuation of the Fez diocese) 
1469 Tanger / Tangier (detached from Ceuta, and from Marrakech)  
1487 Safim (detached from Marrakech before 1487) - (Algarve behind the sea) 
1542 Safim (incorporated in Tanger) - (Algarve behind the sea) 
1566 Marrakech (suppressed) 
1570 Tanger (suppressed) - (Algarve behind the sea) 
1630 Marocco / Marruecos (AP, See in Tanger) - (State of Fez, State of Morocco)
1908 Marocco / Marueccos (AV) - (Spanish Morocco, French Morocco) 
1923 Rabat (AV, detached from Marocco) - (French Morocco) 
1955 Rabat (AD)
1956 Tanger (AD, and new name, previously Marocco) 
Reference Chronology of Catholic Dioceses: Morocco

References

External links 
Catholic Church in Morocco
Archdiocese of Rabat
 Archdiocese of Tangier
 Moroccan Conference of Catholic Bishops
Other
Catholic Campus Ministry in Morocco 
(AECAM: Aumônerie des Etudiants Catholiques au Maroc) 
Catholic Teaching in Morocco : Catholic Schools
(Enseignement Catholique au Maroc)
Church Directory of Morocco

 Church of Saint Andrew, Tangier (Anglican Church of Morocco)

 
Morocco
Morocco